Jason de Haan is a Canadian artist (born ).

Background 
De Haan was born in Edmonton, Alberta. He received his Bachelor of Fine Arts in drawing from Alberta College of Art and Design in 2006. In 2015, de Haan received an MFA from Milton Avery Graduate School of the Arts at Bard College in New York state.

Work 
de Haan's work, which is primarily contemporary art and collage, has been shown at galleries and museums such as the Art Gallery of Alberta, the Museum of Mexico City, the Massachusetts Museum of Contemporary Art, the Sequences Art Festival in Reykjavik, and presented by curators such as Makiko Hara. Jason de Haan has worked as an instructor at the Alberta University of the Arts. In 2020, Jason de Haan received the Sobey Art Award, Canada's largest prize for young Canadian artists.

See also 
 Makiko Hara
 Sobey Art Award

Notes

References

External links 
 Official website

Living people
Artists from Edmonton
Bard College alumni
Canadian male painters
Canadian male artists
Canadian contemporary artists
Canadian collage artists
21st-century Canadian painters
Year of birth missing (living people)
21st-century Canadian male artists